Guangdong Oppo Mobile Telecommunications Corp., Ltd, doing business as OPPO, is a Chinese consumer electronics manufacturer headquartered in Dongguan, Guangdong. Its major product lines include smartphones, smart devices, audio devices, power banks, and other electronic products.

It is reportedly associated with BBK Electronics, while the company officially denies this.

History  
The brand name "Oppo" was registered in China in 2001 and launched in 2004. Since then, the company has expanded to 50 countries.

In June 2016, OPPO became the largest smartphone manufacturer in China, selling its phones at more than 200,000 retail outlets. OPPO was the top smartphone brand in China in 2019 and was ranked No. 5, in market share, worldwide.

Branding 

The South Korean boy band 2PM prepared a song known as "Follow Your Soul" in a promotional deal with OPPO for launching its brand in Thailand in 2010. In June 2015, the company signed an agreement with FC Barcelona to become a sponsor of the Spanish football club.

In 2016, the Philippine Basketball Association tied up with this company as its official smartphone partner, beginning with the 2016 PBA Commissioner's Cup which began on 10 February.

OPPO hires celebrity endorsers in Vietnam. Sơn Tùng M-TP endorsed three smartphone units: Neo 5, Neo 7, and F1s. OPPO made a sponsorship to one of Vietnam's top-rated reality shows, The Face Vietnam.

In 2017, OPPO won the bid to sponsor the India national cricket team, which allows their logo to be used on the team's kits from 2017 to 2019.

In 2019, OPPO became a sponsoring partner of the French Open tennis tournament held in Roland-Garros, Paris. The same year, they also became a sponsoring partner of Wimbledon for 5 years as the first official smartphone partner.

Starting with the 2019 World Championship, OPPO is the exclusive global smartphone partner for League of Legends esports through 2024, OPPO will have year-round activations centered around the sport’s three annual global tournaments: the Mid-Season Invitational, the All-Star Event, and the World Championship.

Products

Smartphones

Headphones and amplifiers 

Released in 2015, the HA-2, was a portable version of the HA-1 amp/DAC, which featured a battery pack option and a stitched leather casing. The phone played music in real-time to the HA-2 (via the included Android micro USB cable or iOS lightning cable, or USB cable if from PC). It also can be charged using an included "rapid charger" charging kit. The battery pack feature can only be used simultaneously while the HA-2 is used to play music if the playing (source) device is an Apple iOS device. In October 2016, an updated version was released with a new DAC chip and now named HA-2SE. Otherwise, it was the same as the HA-2.

Smartwatches 
OPPO launched its first smartwatch, the OPPO Watch, on 6 March 2020 in the Chinese domestic market.

Research and development
In 2021, the WIPO's annual review of the World Intellectual Property Indicators report ranked Oppo as 8th in the world according to the number of patent applications published under the PCT System, with 1,801 patent applications being published during 2020. This position is down from their previous ranking as 5th in 2019 with 1,927 applications.

Partnership with Hasselblad 
In February 2022, OPPO announced a three-year partnership with Hasselblad, to co-develop industry-leading camera technologies for OPPO’s flagship Find X series. The triple-camera 5G handset Oppo Find X5 uses Hasselblad technology for the first time on an Oppo smartphone.

See also 
 Oppo Digital, sharing the brand name with Oppo, is an independently operated division of BBK Electronics that designs and markets audio and video equipment.
 Realme

Notes

References

External links
 

 
BBK Electronics
Audio equipment manufacturers of China
Mobile phone manufacturers
Mobile phone companies of China
Chinese brands
Electronics companies established in 2004
Companies based in Dongguan
Headphones manufacturers
Privately held companies of China
Chinese companies established in 2004